Thuy Loi University (Vietnamese language: Đại học Thủy lợi) is a university in Hanoi, Vietnam. It was established in 1959 as the Electricity Water Resources Academy, spun off from the Hanoi University of Technology.

Thuy Loi University has three campuses in Hanoi (main campus) with a large campus in Ho Chi Minh City and one in Phan Rang–Tháp Chàm, Ninh Thuận Province. The university offers undergraduate and postgraduate programs in water resources management, dam construction, irrigation, flood control, environmental management, civil construction, and hydroelectricity.

External links
 Official Website of Thuy Loi University

Universities in Hanoi
Universities in Ho Chi Minh City
Water supply and sanitation in Vietnam